In Sweden, as well as Norway, a trollkors or troll cross is a bent piece of iron worn as an amulet to ward off malevolent magic, allegedly stemming from medieval Sweden. According to those claiming its authenticity it represented the Norse symbol of protection; thus if a Norseman wore this symbol, they believed that chances of falling into danger would decrease. However, although commonly thought of as a part of Swedish folklore, it was first created—as an item of jewelry—by the smith Kari Erlands from western Dalarna, sometime in the late 1990s. It was claimed to have been a copy of a protective rune found at her grandparents' farm, but this has not been verified. While it does bear some resemblance to the othala rune in Elder Futhark and Anglo-Saxon runic writing systems, it is more likely that Erlands mistook a Bumerke for a protective symbol.

Footnotes

References
 
 

Amulets
Norwegian folklore
Swedish folklore
Superstitions of Scandinavia
Norse demons